Glyn Lewis is a British professor of psychiatric epidemiology and the current head of the Division of Psychiatry at University College London

Education 
Glyn Lewis was born in Wales. He studied at University College, Oxford, where he played saxophone with The Oxcentrics, a Dixieland jazz band. Lewis trained as a psychiatrist at the Maudsley Hospital in London and as an epidemiologist at the London School of Hygiene and Tropical Medicine. He received his PhD from the Institute of Psychiatry at King's College London.

Research 
Lewis worked at the University of Bristol and the Cardiff University prior to his current post at UCL. He has published extensively on psychiatric epidemiology, including investigating the causes of psychiatric disorders. His research is in the area of the aetiology of schizophrenia and depression and the treatment of depression and other mental disorders. He has published widely in leading journals such as The Lancet, including research on the risk of psychosis due to the use of cannabis and the mental health of Afghan and Iraq veterans. He has conducted several randomized controlled trials, including the PREVENT study, a trial comparing antidepressants with mindfulness-based cognitive therapy, ANTLER Antidepressants to prevent relapse in depression, and PANDA, a trial investigating the effectiveness of antidepressants in mild depression.

References

External links 
 Glyn Lewis homepage at University College London

Year of birth missing (living people)
Living people
Alumni of University College, Oxford
Academics of the University of Bristol
Welsh psychiatrists
Psychiatry academics
Oxcentrics members
NIHR Senior Investigators
English jazz saxophonists